"Concert for Aliens" (stylized in all lowercase) is a song by Machine Gun Kelly. It was released as the second single from his fifth studio album Tickets to My Downfall. It peaked at number 17 on the Billboard Hot Rock & Alternative Songs chart in 2020.

Background
The song debuted live on the nationally televised show Good Morning America on July 20, 2020, when Machine Gun Kelly (Colson Baker) and drummer Travis Barker performed the track. The following day, Baker posted the clip to social media and confirmed that the song would be the second single from his upcoming fifth studio album Tickets to My Downfall. Multiple music videos were released for the song. On August 5, an animated video was released, featuring Baker and Barker trying to escape from aliens, which eventually transitions to them playing a concert for the aliens. A second video, directed by Mod Sun, was released on August 13, 2020. The video, make of live action footage, alternates between footage of Baker and Barker performing the song in front of a crowd of aliens, and footage of Baker dressed up and acting silly in a variety of costumes, including a gameshow host, an actor, a sailor, an emo teenager, and a stereotypical "villain" type character. The video received 250,000 views in the first three hours of availability alone.

Themes and composition
Publications generally described the song as pop-punk. Pitchfork called it a faithful homage to Blink-182's Enema of the State. Despite the song's upbeat sound and humorous video, Baker noted that the song was meant to have a serious message, serving as a metaphor for the chaos and civil unrest present in the year 2020, with the song lyrics making allusions to the end of the world.

Reception
AllMusic and Digital Journal considered the song a standout on Tickets to My Downfall. Wall of Sound called it an "absolute fucking anthem." Rock Sins called it a song Simple Plan would be grateful to still be able to write. Conversely, Sputnikmusic called the vocals overproduced and that Baker sings in a nasally baritone.

Charts

Weekly charts

Year-end charts

Personnel
Credits adapted from Tidal.
 Machine Gun Kelly – vocals, guitar
 Travis Barker – production
 Nick Long – guitar
 Colin Leonard – master engineering
 Adam Hawkins – mixing

Release history

References

2020 songs
2020 singles
Machine Gun Kelly (musician) songs
American pop punk songs
Animated music videos
Song recordings produced by Travis Barker
Songs written by Machine Gun Kelly (musician)
Songs written by Travis Barker